USS S-4 (SS-109) was an S-class submarine of the United States Navy. In 1927, she was sunk by being accidentally rammed by a United States Coast Guard destroyer with the loss of all hands but was raised and restored to service until stricken in 1936.

Construction
S-4s keel was laid down on 4 December 1917 by the Portsmouth Navy Yard in Portsmouth, New Hampshire, and Kittery, Maine. She was launched on 27 August 1919 sponsored by Mrs. Herbert S. Howard, and commissioned on 19 November 1919.

Service
Following acceptance trials, a visit to Havana, Cuba from 14–19 January 1920, and subsequent operations along the Gulf of Mexico and New England coasts, S-4 departed New London, Connecticut on 18 November to rendezvous off New Hampshire with her assigned unit — Submarine Divisions 12 (SubDiv 12) — and SubDiv 18. The two divisions were about to embark on a historic voyage which, at that time, was to be the longest cruise undertaken by American submarines. Assigned to Submarine Flotilla 3 of the Asiatic Fleet at Cavite in the Philippine Islands, they sailed via the Panama Canal and Pearl Harbor and arrived at Cavite on 1 December 1921.

S-4 operated out of the Cavite Naval Station, with occasional visits to Chinese ports, until late 1924, when the two divisions were reassigned to the United States West Coast. Departing Cavite on 29 October, they arrived at Mare Island, California on 30 December.

Remaining at Mare Island in 1925, she operated along the U.S. West Coast through 1926, mainly at San Francisco, San Pedro Submarine Base-San Pedro, and San Diego, California. She departed Mare Island on 10 February 1927 and sailed to the Panama Canal Zone, where she operated through March–April, then proceeded to New London, Connecticut, arriving on 3 May. For the remainder of the year, she operated off the New England coast.

Sinking

On 17 December 1927, while surfacing from a submerged run over the measured-mile off Provincetown, Massachusetts, she was accidentally rammed and sunk by the United States Coast Guard destroyer  on Rum Patrol.

Paulding stopped and lowered lifeboats, but found only a small amount of oil and air bubbles. Rescue and salvage operations were commenced led by Rear Admiral Frank Brumby, Captain Ernest J. King, Lieutenant Henry Hartley and Commander Edward Ellsberg, only to be thwarted by severe weather. Significant effort was made to rescue six known survivors trapped in the forward torpedo room, who had exchanged a series of signals with the rescue force, by tapping on the hull. As the trapped men used the last of available oxygen in the sub, they sent a morse-coded message, “Is there any hope?” The response, composed by Captain King was: "There is hope. Everything possible is being done." Thwarted by the weather, the rescue force could not rescue the six men and all 40 men aboard were lost.

During the course of the rescue operation Chief Gunner's Mate Thomas Eadie rescued, at the risk of his own life, a fellow diver, Fred Michels, who became fouled in the wreckage while attempting to attach an air hose to S-4.  For his heroism Eadie was awarded the Medal of Honor.

S-4 was raised on 17 March 1928, by a salvage effort commanded by Capt. King. Several of the salvage divers, including Eadie and previous Medal of Honor recipient Frank W. Crilley, were awarded the Navy Cross for their actions during the operation.  Another Medal of Honor recipient, Chief Boatswain George Cregan, received the Navy Cross for his service as commander of the tugboat  during the rescue attempt. The submarine was towed to the Boston Navy Yard for dry-docking and was decommissioned on 19 March 1928.

Return
S-4 was recommissioned on 16 October 1928, after repairs and conversion to a test vessel for submarine rescue experimentation. She served at Key West, Florida early in 1929–1930, and in the Northeastern United States during the remainder of those years. In 1931, she operated again at New London until departing there on 3 January 1932 for Pearl Harbor. Sailing via the Panama Canal, she arrived at Pearl Harbor on 29 August. On 7 April 1933, S-4 was decommissioned and laid up. She was stricken from the Naval Vessel Register on 15 January 1936 and scuttled on 15 May 1936.

References

External links
On Eternal Patrol: USS S-4

Ships built in Kittery, Maine
United States S-class submarines
S-4, USS
Maritime incidents in 1927
United States submarine accidents
Submarines sunk in collisions
1919 ships
Warships lost with all hands
Scuttled vessels
Maritime incidents in 1936